Leipzig II is an electoral constituency (German: Wahlkreis) represented in the Bundestag. It elects one member via first-past-the-post voting. Under the current constituency numbering system, it is designated as constituency 153. It is located in northwestern Saxony, comprising the southern part of the city of Leipzig.

Leipzig II was created for the inaugural 1990 federal election after German reunification. Since 2017, it has been represented by Sören Pellmann of The Left.

Geography
Leipzig II is located in northwestern Saxony. As of the 2021 federal election, it comprises the city districts (Stadtbezirke) of Mitte, Süd, Südost, Südwest, and West from the independent city of Leipzig.

History
Leipzig II was created after German reunification in 1990. In the 1990 through 1998 elections, it was constituency 310 in the numbering system. From 2002 through 2009, it was number 154. Since 2013, it has been number 153.

Originally, the constituency comprised the Stadtbezirke of Süd-Ost, Süd, Süd-West, and West II from the independent city of Leipzig. It acquired its current borders in the 2002 election.

Members
The constituency was first represented by Gerhard Schulz of the Christian Democratic Union (CDU) from 1990 to 1998. It was won by Gunter Weißgerber of the Social Democratic Party (SPD) in 1998 who represented it until 2009, when it was won by Thomas Feist of the CDU. Sören Pellmann of The Left was elected in 2017 and re-elected in 2021.

Election results

2021 election

2017 election

2013 election

2009 election

Notes

References

Federal electoral districts in Saxony
1990 establishments in Germany
Constituencies established in 1990
Leipzig